Cephetola ouesso is a butterfly in the family Lycaenidae. It is found in Cameroon, the Republic of the Congo and the Central African Republic.

References

Butterflies described in 1962
Poritiinae